The Suia-Miçu River (or Suia Missu River) is a river of Mato Grosso state in western Brazil.

See also
List of rivers of Mato Grosso

References

Brazilian Ministry of Transport

Rivers of Mato Grosso